A monoamine releasing agent (MRA), or simply monoamine releaser, is a drug that induces the release of a monoamine neurotransmitter from the presynaptic neuron into the synapse, leading to an increase in the extracellular concentrations of the neurotransmitter. Many drugs induce their effects in the body and/or brain via the release of monoamine neurotransmitters, e.g., trace amines, many substituted amphetamines, and related compounds.

Types of MRAs
MRAS can be classified by the monoamines they mainly release, although these drugs lie on a spectrum.

 Selective for one neurotransmitter
 Serotonin releasing agent (SRA)
 Norepinephrine releasing agent (NRA)
 Dopamine releasing agent (DRA)
 Non-selective, releasing two or more neurotransmitters
 Norepinephrine–dopamine releasing agent (NDRA)
 Serotonin–norepinephrine releasing agent (SNRA)
 Serotonin–dopamine releasing agent (SDRA)
 Serotonin–norepinephrine–dopamine releasing agent (SNDRA)

Mechanism of action

MRAs cause the release of monoamine neurotransmitters by various complex mechanism of actions.  They may enter the presynaptic neuron primarily via plasma membrane transporters, such as the dopamine transporter (DAT), norepinephrine transporter (NET), and serotonin transporter (SERT). Some, such as exogenous phenethylamine, amphetamine, and methamphetamine, can also diffuse directly across the cell membrane to varying degrees. Once inside the presynaptic neuron, they may inhibit the reuptake of monoamine neurotransmitters through vesicular monoamine transporter 2 (VMAT2) and release the neurotransmitters stores of synaptic vesicles into the cytoplasm by inducing reverse transport at VMAT2. MRAs can also bind to the intracellular receptor TAAR1 as agonists, which triggers a phosphorylation cascade via protein kinases that results in the phosphorylation of monoamine transporters located at the plasma membrane (i.e., the dopamine transporter, norepinephrine transporter, and serotonin transporter); upon phosphorylation, these transporters transport monoamines in reverse (i.e., they move monoamines from the neuronal cytoplasm into the synaptic cleft). The combined effects of MRAs at VMAT2 and TAAR1 result in the release of neurotransmitters out of synaptic vesicles and the cell cytoplasm into the synaptic cleft where they bind to their associated presynaptic autoreceptors and postsynaptic receptors. Certain MRAs interact with other presynaptic intracellular receptors which promote monoamine neurotransmission as well (e.g., methamphetamine is also an agonist at σ1 receptor).

Effects

Monoamine releasing agents can have a wide variety of effects depending upon their selectivity for monoamines.  Selective serotonin releasing agents such as fenfluramine and related compounds are described as dysphoric and lethargic in lower doses, and in higher doses some hallucinogenic effects have been reported. Less selective serotonergic agents that stimulate an efflux in dopamine, such as MDMA are described as more pleasant, increasing energy, sociability and elevating mood. Dopamine releasing agents, usually selective for both norepinephrine and dopamine have psychostimulant effect, causing an increase in energy, and elevated mood. Other variables can significantly affect the subjective effects, such as infusion rate(increasing positive effects of cocaine), and expectancy.  Selectively noradrenergic drugs are minimally psychoactive, but as demonstrated by ephedrine may be distinguished from placebo, and trends towards liking.  They may also be ergogenic, in contrast to  reboxetine which is solely a reuptake inhibitor.

Selectivity
MRAs act to varying extents on serotonin, norepinephrine, and dopamine. Some induce the release of all three neurotransmitters to a similar degree, like MDMA, while others are more selective. As examples, amphetamine and methamphetamine are NDRAs but only very weak releasers of serotonin (~60- and 30-fold less than dopamine, respectively) and MBDB is a fairly balanced SNRA but a weak releaser of dopamine (~6- and 10-fold lower for dopamine than norepinephrine or serotonin, respectively). Even more selective include agents like fenfluramine, a selective SRA, and ephedrine, a selective NRA. The differences in selectivity of these agents is the result of different affinities as substrates for the monoamine transporters, and thus differing ability to gain access into monoaminergic neurons and induce monoamine neurotransmitter release via the TAAR1 and VMAT2 proteins.

As of present, no selective DRAs are known. This is because it has proven extremely difficult to separate DAT affinity from NET affinity and retain releasing efficacy at the same time. Several selective SDRAs are known however, though these compounds also act as non-selective serotonin receptor agonists.

Activity profiles

See also 
 Monoamine reuptake inhibitor
 Release modulator

References

External links

 
TAAR1 agonists
VMAT inhibitors